Tau Canis Majoris (τ CMa, τ Canis Majoris, 30 CMa) is a multiple star system in the constellation Canis Major.  It is approximately 5,000 light years distant from Earth and is the brightest member of the open cluster NGC 2362.

System
τ Canis Majoris lies at the center of the very young open cluster NGC 2362 which contains several hundred stars.  It is by far the brightest member of the cluster and the only one to have evolved away from the main sequence.  A number of stars were catalogued by John Herschel as companions: component B is a 10th magnitude star 8.6 arc-seconds distant; component C is a 14th magnitude star 14.2 arc-seconds away; and component D is an 8th magnitude star at 85 arc-seconds.  These stars are all thought to be main sequence members of NGC 2362.  A period of 94,000 years has been suggested for the AB pair assuming they are gravitationally bound.

In 1951, component A was resolved into a double separated by only 0.15", with an estimated orbital period of 250 years.  The Washington Double Star catalogue lists the pair as magnitude 4.89 Aa and magnitude 5.33 Ab, but the CCDM designates the components as A and P. A 10th magnitude component E was discovered in 2010.  It is less than 1" away from the 4th magnitude main component.

The primary component A is itself a spectroscopic binary with a period of 154.918 days.  The variable radial velocity was discovered in 1906 and the first orbit published in 1928.  More recently, the Hipparcos satellite data revealed the existence of a 1.282 day eclipsing binary within the system, with two equal minima where the brightness dips by half a magnitude.  The short period eclipsing pair is the fainter component of the two longer period spectroscopic binary, forming an unusual triple star with the most massive component orbiting  pair of smaller stars.  These three stars are referred to as Aa, Ab1, and Ab2, not to be confused with the fainter visible star 0.15 arc-seconds distant.

UW Canis Majoris is another 4th magnitude star less than half a degree away, and is itself an eclipsing binary system associated with NGC 2362.  It has been catalogued as τ2 CMa, but that name is now rarely used.

Properties
τ Canis Majoris appears as a class O supergiant at a distance of 5,000 light years within the open cluster NGC 2362, but this is composed of multiple stars. The properties of the minor components of the τ CMa system are poorly known. Component D has been described as having spectral type B2V, but this is uncertain. The relative brightnesses of the three spectroscopic components have been calculated from the eclipses and orbital movement. The spectrum, mass, and luminosity is dominated by component Aa which is now considered to be an O9 bright giant.

This star is sometimes known as the 'Mexican Jumping Star' by amateur astronomers, because it can appear to 'jump around' with respect to the other stars in the cluster because of its marked contrast in brightness.

References

External links
 The Mexican Jumping Star

Canis Majoris, Tau
Beta Lyrae variables
Canis Major
Spectroscopic binaries
O-type bright giants
B-type main-sequence stars
Canis Majoris, 30
2782
057061
035415
Durchmusterung objects
3